Georgia State Route 5 Alternate may refer to:

 Georgia State Route 5 Alternate (Cherokee–Pickens County): a former alternate route of State Route 5 that existed in Cherokee and Pickens counties
 Georgia State Route 5 Alternate (Gilmer County): a former alternate route of State Route 5 that existed in Gilmer County

0005 Alternate